Davy Group is Ireland's largest stockbroker, wealth manager, asset manager and financial advisor and has offices in Dublin, Belfast, Cork, Galway and London. Davy offers services to private clients, small businesses, corporations and institutional investors.

As of 2007, Davy employed over 700 people and operated as an independent company owned by management and staff. In 2021, Davy "put itself up for sale" after being fined by the Central Bank of Ireland for breaching market rules. The sale was completed, to Bank of Ireland, in mid-2022.

Description
Davy accounted for approximately 40 per cent of all dealings in Irish equities on the Irish Stock Exchange in 2009 and until 2021 was the only domestically based primary dealer in Irish Government Bonds and acts as arranger on most Irish corporate bond issues. It acts as broker to 9 of the top 10 companies listed on the Irish Stock Exchange and 15 out of the 24 companies listed on the ESM (Ireland's
equivalent of AIM). Davy is also responsible for circa 70 per cent of funds raised on the
Irish Stock Exchange.

According to annual accounts published Davy had retained profits at the end of 2011 of €110.545 million compared with €124.99 million in the previous year. This €15 million reduction in its accumulated profits is believed to have been the result of the dividend payment to shareholders. When added to last year's profit, it indicates a distribution to the 100-plus staff who participated in the management buy-out of €25 million. Davy closed last year with net assets of €131.1 million.

History

20th century

James and Eugene Davy were raised in Rathmines and James, on the advice of his UCD economics professor, decided to enter stockbroking after graduating with a degree in Economics, while Eugene graduated with a law degree.

In 1926, a few years after Irish independence, James Davy became a member of the Dublin Stock Exchange and was soon joined by his brother Eugene to establish J&E Davy, with its first office located on Westmoreland Street. At the time, Irish stockbroking was dominated by brokers who trained in London and lacked a more specific Irish perspective. The bulk of business consisted of buying and selling major British-quoted shares for private clients. It was in this environment that J&E Davy set about building up a stockbroking business.

Over the next two decades the two brothers gradually built up the company by tapping into the slowly emerging Catholic middle class, (the majority of its competitors being run by Protestants). It was also helped by Eugene Davy's contact's obtained through playing rugby, being capped 34 times for Ireland, acting as manager of the national team, and eventually becoming President of the IRFU.

Their respective sons Brian and Joseph began to take control of the broker in the 1960s. Davy handled its first IPO listing on the Irish Stock Exchange in 1964.

In 1988, Bank of Ireland acquired a majority stake in Davy and increased that to 90% in 1992.

21st century

In 2004, Davy opened an office in Cork providing wealth management and corporate finance services to clients in the Munster region.

By 2005, Davy was responsible for the listings of over 60% of the companies on the Irish Stock Exchange.

In 2006, it became independent again following a management and staff buy-out of the company with loans provided by Anglo Irish Bank for €316 million, a figure acknowledged to reflect top of market conditions. This year also brought the opening of another regional office for Davy, located in Galway.

The same year, Davy opened a dedicated office for Northern Ireland, located in Belfast city centre.

In August 2010, Davy opened its first overseas office in London.

Davy was the only Irish dealer in Irish Government Bonds, when the country returned to the market for the first time since 2010 in January 2012.

In 2012, Davy Research was named Ireland's No.1 brokerage and also the country's No.1 Equity Research Team in the Institutional Investor All-Europe Research Team 2012 Survey.

Davy advised the Irish Government on the sale of the national lottery license, operated by the stated owned An Post.

On 8 March 2012, Davy announced acquired Bloxham Stockbrokers private client business. The following May, Davy announced that it had acquired Bloxham's asset management business. The deal, together with the acquisition of Bloxham's private client business added approximately €1.2billion to the value of assets under management by Davy.

On 3 October 2012, Davy launched Davy Select, an online investment fund "supermarket" aimed at consumers looking to invest as little as €500 in a pension.
The platform – which cost Davy €10 million to develop – was modelled on UK online fund selection sites which captured 20 per cent of the market in five years. Davy called for the abolition of exit charges by all pension providers "so that consumers can invest on the basis of performance and service and not be restricted by anti-consumer lock-in agreements".

When the Irish Stock Exchange demutualised in April 2014, the broker became its largest shareholder holding 37.5% of the Exchange.

In 2022, J&E Davy Stockbrokers (trading as Davy) was acquired by Bank of Ireland in a €427m deal.

Controversy

Bribery and payments to politicians
The Mahon Tribunal established that Davy, throughout the 1980s and 1990s, made a series of payments to the corrupt politician Liam Lawlor.

In 1992, Davy made a political donation of £5,000 to Bertie Ahern, which ended-up in his personal account at Irish Life & Permanent plc.

The next year the firm was the subject of an Irish Stock Exchange inquiry over the handling of the flotation of Greencore plc, the recently privatised Irish Sugar Company. The then Taoiseach, Albert Reynolds did not hold back in his criticism "you employ professional people to do the job...it was not done in a professional manner." The Managing Partner resigned.

Tax evasion
Davy admitted that its representatives in 1999 devised a Liechtenstein based tax evasion scheme uncovered by the public service broadcaster, RTÉ. A Davy spokesman confirmed that the scheme outlined in the memo was not used.

Insider trading scandal
In a high profile 2005 insider dealer case, the chief executive of Fyffes plc whose shares were the subject of the illicit trading said that he was "set up" by Davy and misled by a presentation to investors by Davy on behalf of his company. He also told the High Court he believed there was an arrangement between Davy and the party found responsible by the courts of insider dealing for the purpose of selling the shares they held in his company.

Investment bonds mis-selling scandal
Two reports of an investigation into the "wholly inappropriate sale of perpectual bonds" by Davy to credit unions failed to involve any of the credit unions affected, leaving them "in the dark and powerless to add any value to the findings of this investigation". The Irish Stock Exchange, who has Davy as one of its largest shareholders, and the Central Bank of Ireland then declined to give them access to the reports. The Chairman of one of the Credit Unions who suffered large losses told his members The failure to publish the reports is to place the complaints process in a shroud of secrecy. Such a failure of openness, transparency and fairness can only serve to undermine confidence in the complaints process, forcing those with grievances into the courts. Such a course of action is not in the interest of any of the stakeholders." A statement issued by the Irish Stock Exchange in relation to these reports acknowledged important mitigating factors such as: the changed investment demands of credit unions which were seeking higher yield investments, fundamentally altered conditions in bond markets, and the extensive interaction between Davy and its credit union clients. The Exchange stated that it was satisfied that Davy had taken appropriate remedial action to ensure that internal controls and conduct of business procedures had been rectified to mitigate against any recurrence of the breaches discovered.

Enfield Credit Union agreed to accept a €35 million offer from Davy to credit unions affected by the sale of investment bonds to settle its claim against the stockbroking firm that it claimed Davy mis-sold to them. The terms secured by Enfield's advisers also applied to all the credit unions who are nursing losses of about €75 million on the €183 million worth of bonds Davy sold to them.  Around 100 credit unions suffered a second round of losses because the bond that Davy acquired to compensate them for the earlier losses itself crashed in value.

2011 Central Bank of Ireland fine
In December 2011, the Central Bank reprimanded and fined the firm for failing to report 61,542 transactions. Davy said that the breaches were "technical" and had been reported to the regulator by the firm in September 2010. "These were wholly technical reporting issues, with no client impact which were identified by Davy and voluntarily reported to the Central Bank, " a spokesman said.

Contract for Difference (CFD) pushing scandal
In April 2014 a young man described as "very vulnerable" with intellectual and other difficulties having suffered two strokes by the age of ten was awarded more than €2m by the High Court after the stockbroking engaged in "deliberate neglect" and breach of duty of care in encouraging him to invest large amounts of his inherited €5m monies in "seriously risky" contracts for difference resulting in substantial investment losses. The only child aged just 20 when he began his investment relationship with Davy using some €5m inherited from his dead parents, was "not a person in the full of their intellectual, physical and mental health", the judge said and "should have been obvious to any observer of average perception" and many tests carried out on him showed "alarming degrees of impairment". There was a "systems failure" in Davy concerning its treatment of the vulnerable young man who they had sign blank paperwork, failures in its documents section and failure in responsibility by higher management, including a senior manager who certified in a "paper-covering exercise" that their client was suitable for Contract for Difference (CFD) trading, the judge found. In a statement by Davy, the firm acknowledged "that initial trading gains recorded by the plaintiff on his Davy account were more than offset by subsequent losses during the downturn in 2008 and that processes in place at that time did not take adequate account of the plaintiff's unique circumstances,". It said the "processes in place at Davy at the time the investments were made pre-dated major regulatory changes and these had been reviewed and enhanced in line with regulatory developments since". Davy said that "it would carefully assess the outcome from the case that might benefit Davy clients in the future".

Siteserv controversy

In January 2012 the board of Siteserv announced the appointment of Davy Corporate Finance to advise (alongside KMPG) on their strategic and corporate options given the pending maturity of their debt with IBRC. 18 months after the Siteserv deal Des Carville, the Davy adviser on the transaction joined the Department of Finance. In responses to parliamentary questions posed, the Department of Finance said that Carville had declared a potential conflict of interest arising from his involvement with Siteserv before he joined. The government said he "has not been involved in any issues on the Siteserv transaction" such as approving parliamentary questions, reviewing freedom of information requests and all internal discussions on the matter.

Catherine Murphy, the Independent TD who was prominent in querying the role of the department and state-owned IBRC in selling Siteserv at a €105 million loss to taxpayers, had further answers to parliamentary questions submitted to Noonan. Murphy also asked Noonan about a possibility that the purchase of Siteserv shares using privileged information might have occurred while the sale process was ongoing. Noonan said his department does not monitor share dealing activity. In response Davy said "Davy would welcome any investigation that the appropriate regulatory authorities initiate in respect of sharedealings in Siteserv and are confident that any such investigation will prove these allegations to be totally without foundation."

2021 bond trading scandal
In March 2021 the Davy Group was fined €4.1m by the Central Bank of Ireland relating to a 2014 bond trading deal in which 16 Davy employees including CEO Brian McKiernan and former Chairman Kyran McLaughlin, were involved in acquiring bonds for a below market value price of €5.58m from a client and not disclosing to the client that it was Davy staff who had bought the bonds. The bonds were later sold on at a profit to a third party fund manager. Following the investigation by the Central Bank of Ireland and the issuing of the fine many of the senior executive team were forced to resign and the business was put up for sale.

Sponsorship
Davy has sponsorship deals with a number of Irish institutions and sports people including golfers Leona Maguire, Paul Dunne and Ronan Mullarney, the National Concert Hall and the Irish Times'' "Inside Business" podcast.

On 9 June 2008, Davy launched the Inaugural Davy Portrait Awards, in association with Arts & Business. The main prizes total €19,000 and were awarded by a judging panel of Royal Hibernian Academy President Stephen McKenna, Royal Ulster Academy President Rita Duffy and international art critic and writer Gemma Tipton.

See also
Bloxham Stockbrokers

References

Financial services in the Republic of Ireland
Irish brands